The Wetlands Cultural Byway is a Louisiana Scenic Byway that follows several different state highways, primarily:
LA 1 and LA 308 along opposite banks of Bayou Lafourche through Lafourche Parish;
LA 20 and LA 24 generally along Bayou Terrebonne from Thibodaux to Larose;
LA 56 along the west bank of Bayou Petit Caillou from Cocodrie to Houma;
LA 57 generally along the east bank of Bayou Grand Caillou from north of Cocodrie to Houma;
LA 182 along the west bank of Bayou Black from Gibson to Houma; and
LA 304 and LA 307 in a loop off of the Bayou Lafourche corridor from west of Thibodaux to Raceland.

References

Louisiana Scenic Byways
Tourist attractions in Lafourche Parish, Louisiana
Tourist attractions in Terrebonne Parish, Louisiana
Scenic highways in Louisiana